Carlos Alberto Ribeiro Pereira, commonly known as Carlos Alberto (born 10 October 1974) is a retired Brazilian football defender.

References

1974 births
Living people
Brazilian footballers
RFC Liège players
K.S.V. Waregem players
Campinense Clube players
Sport Club Barueri players
Boavista F.C. players
Çaykur Rizespor footballers
A.O. Kerkyra players
Guarani FC players
Association football defenders
Belgian Pro League players
Primeira Liga players
Super League Greece players
Brazilian expatriate footballers
Expatriate footballers in Belgium
Brazilian expatriate sportspeople in Belgium
Expatriate footballers in Portugal
Brazilian expatriate sportspeople in Portugal
Expatriate footballers in Turkey
Brazilian expatriate sportspeople in Turkey
Expatriate footballers in Greece
Brazilian expatriate sportspeople in Greece